Big Hit Music (stylised in all caps), formerly Big Hit Entertainment, is a South Korean music label established in 2005 by Bang Si-hyuk. It was re-branded and re-structured into an independent label under Hybe Corporation (formerly Big Hit Entertainment Co., Ltd.) in March 2021. As of date, the label is home to soloist Lee Hyun, and boy groups BTS and Tomorrow X Together. It previously managed soloist Lim Jeong-hee, and groups 8Eight, 2AM, and co-managed Glam.

History

2005–2021: Big Hit Entertainment 

Big Hit Entertainment was founded on February 1, 2005, and signed the vocal trio 8Eight in 2007. In 2010, the company signed a joint management contract with JYP Entertainment over the boy group 2AM. That year, Bang Si-hyuk signed RM as the first member of BTS and launched nationwide auditions to recruit other members of the group—BTS made their debut under Big Hit on June 13, 2013.

In 2012, the company signed Lim Jeong-hee, and formed the girl group GLAM as a collaboration with Source Music. The group was active until 2014 when it was disbanded due to a controversy involving one of its members, Kim Da-hee—Kim was sentenced to prison after being found guilty of blackmailing actor Lee Byung-hun.

Following the end of the joint contract between Big Hit and JYP in April 2014, three members of 2AM returned to JYP, while Lee Chang-min remained with Big Hit in order to continue with his solo career and as part of the duo Homme. The year also saw the disbandment of 8Eight after Baek Chan and Joo Hee's contracts with Big Hit ended. In May 2015, Lim Jeong-hee parted ways with the agency, following the expiration of her three-year contract.

In February 2018, Homme disbanded after member Changmin's contract came to an end. He left the company to start his own agency, while Lee Hyun continued on as a solo artist. In October, BTS renewed and extended their contract with the agency for seven more years. Big Hit debuted its second male group, Tomorrow X Together (TXT), in March 2019.

In February 2021, Big Hit announced a partnership with Universal Music Group, which would include a joint venture between Big Hit America and Geffen Records on a Los Angeles-based label and to develop a pop group under a K-pop-influenced model, and UMG exploring further use of Big Hit's social platform Weverse. As a consequence of this partnership, Big Hit reached an agreement in October for BTS to move its distribution in the U.S. and several other countries from Sony Music's Columbia Records and The Orchard to Universal.

2021–present: Big Hit Music 
On March 19, 2021, Big Hit Entertainment announced that it had been renamed Hybe Corporation to emphasize its wider array of business units and ventures. With the change, the Big Hit record label was renamed Big Hit Music . On April 1, 2021, Hybe announced through a board resolution that it would separate the label business (Big Hit Music) from Hybe and establish a new company with 100% of the stake held by Hybe. On July 1, 2021, Big Hit Music became a subsidiary of Hybe.

Philanthropy
In 2017, Big Hit Entertainment donated ₩30 million to the 4/16 Sewol Families for Truth and A Safer Society, an organization connected to the families of the 2014 Sewol Ferry Disaster. In June 2020, Big Hit, together with BTS, donated $1 million in support of the Black Lives Matter movement, during the George Floyd protests, and another $1 million to Live Nation's Crew Nation campaign to help support live music personnel during the COVID-19 pandemic.

Artists

Groups
 BTS
 Tomorrow X Together

Soloists
 Lee Hyun
 RM
 Agust D 
 J-Hope
 Jin
 Jimin

Producers
 "Hitman" Bang
 Pdogg
 Slow Rabbit
 Supreme Boi
 Suga
 RM
 J-Hope

Choreographers
 Son Sung-deuk

Former artists 

 K.Will (2005–2007, co-managed by JYP Entertainment)
 2AM (2010–2014, co-managed by JYP Entertainment)
 Jo Kwon (2010–2014)
 8Eight (2007–2014, co-managed by Source Music)
 Glam (2012–2015, co-managed by Source Music)
 Lim Jeong-hee (2012–2015, co-managed by JYP Entertainment)
 Homme (2010–2018)
 Changmin (2010–2018)

Discography

References

External links
 

Hybe Corporation
K-pop record labels
South Korean record labels
Talent agencies of South Korea
2005 establishments in South Korea
Companies based in Seoul
Entertainment companies established in 2005
Record labels established in 2005
Labels distributed by Universal Music Group